Philippsthal (Werra) is a market community in Hersfeld-Rotenburg district in eastern Hesse, Germany, right at the boundary with Thuringia.

Geography

Location
Philippsthal lies between the outliers of the Rhön and the Thuringian Forest (ranges) on the river Werra. The river Ulster empties into the Werra between the main centre and the outlying centre of Röhrigshof.

The nearest major towns are Bad Hersfeld (some 25 km to the west) and Eisenach (some 29 km to the northeast).

Neighbouring communities
Philippsthal borders in the north on the town of Heringen (in Hersfeld-Rotenburg), in the east on the town of Vacha, in the south on the communities of Unterbreizbach (both in the Wartburgkreis in Thuringia) and Hohenroda and in the west on the community of Friedewald (both in Hersfeld-Rotenburg).

Constituent communities
The community’s Ortsteile are Gethsemane, Harnrode, Heimboldshausen, Philippsthal, Röhrigshof and Unterneurode. All these places were merged into a new greater community of Philippsthal (Werra) within the framework of municipal reform on 1 August 1972. The title “market community” (Marktgemeinde) was granted the community on 30 May 2001.

History

In 1191, Philippsthal had its first documentary mention in a Schutzbrief (“protection letter”) from Pope Celestine III to the Hersfeld Abbey. In this year, the Abbey founded a Benedictine convent and named it after the living knightly family von Cruceburg, after whom the growing community of Kreuzberg was then also named.

The convent was destroyed in the German Peasants' War in 1525 and forsaken by the nuns in 1568. All that is still preserved is the former convent church from the 12th century. On the spot where the convent stood, Landgrave Philipp of Hesse-Philippsthal (b. 14 December 1655, d. 18 June 1721) had a palatial residence built in 1685, which he named Schloss Philippsthal. By the late 18th century, this had become the local placename.

After mining began at the Hattorf potash works in 1905, the craft and weaving village became an industrial community.

During the time of Germany’s division, the former Hoßfeld printing shop building earned some fame as the border between East Germany and West Germany ran straight through it. Only in 1976 did East and West Germany agree to a border adjustment that put the whole property in West Germany.

Politics

Community council

The municipal election held on 26 March 2006 yielded the following results:

The community’s executive (Gemeindevorstand) is made up of ten members, with four seats allotted to the SPD, two to the CDU and four to the FWG.

Mayors
The mayoral election on 16 September 2007 brought Ralf Orth (SPD) into office with 55.1% of the vote. Since 1 January 2008 he has been Hartwig Klotzbach’s (FWG) successor after the latter had held the office since 2001. In 2019 Timo Heusner (SPD) was elected mayor.

Coat of arms
The community’s arms might be described thus: Gules a mount of three argent, issuant therefrom a cross of Lorraine pattée of the second, upon the mound an inescutcheon azure a lion rampant barry of nine argent and gules armed and crowned Or.

The “double cross” recalls the convent in the community and the Hersfeld Abbey, which was a definite factor in earlier centuries. The striped lion (Hesse’s heraldic beast) stands for the Landgraves of Hesse-Kassel, into whose ownership the community came in the 16th century.

Town partnerships
 Salies-du-Salat, Haute-Garonne, France since 1974
 Vacha, Thuringia since 1990
 Dorndorf, Thuringia since 1990

Culture and sightseeing

Museum
 Border Museum at the Torbogenhaus (“Gate Arch House”)

Buildings
 Schloss Philippsthal (palace)
 Orangery in the palace park
 Three-naved convent church from the 12th century

References

Further reading
 Philippsthal, in: Meyers Konversationslexikon, 4. edit. 1888-89, vol. 12, p. 1006.
 Das Haus Hessen-Philippsthal, in: Meyers Konversationslexikon, 4. edit. 1888-89, vol. 8, p. 486.

External links

  
 

Hersfeld-Rotenburg